|}

The Diomed Stakes is a Group 3 flat horse race in Great Britain open to horses aged three years or older. It is run at Epsom Downs over a distance of 1 mile and 113 yards (1,713 metres), and it is scheduled to take place each year in late May or early June.

The event is named after Diomed, the inaugural winner of Epsom's most famous race, the Epsom Derby. It was established in 1971, although it could be regarded as a continuation of a previous event, the St James Stakes.

The Diomed Stakes is now held on the second day of Epsom's two-day Derby Festival meeting, the same day as the Epsom Derby.

Records
Most successful horse (2 wins):
 All Friends – 1975, 1976
 Nayyir – 2002, 2006
 Blythe Knight – 2007, 2008
 Century Deam - 2018, 2020

Leading jockey (4 wins):
 Lester Piggott – Sparkler (1971), Averof (1974), Hardgreen (1980), Adonijah (1984)

Leading trainer (3 wins):
 Clive Brittain – Averof (1974), Sylva Honda (1991), Mr Martini (1995)
 Henry Cecil – Ovac (1978), Adonijah (1984), Shining Steel (1989)
 Andrew Balding - Passing Glance (2004), Side Glance (2012), Tullius (2016)

Winners

See also
 Horse racing in Great Britain
 List of British flat horse races

References
 Paris-Turf:
 Racing Post:

 galopp-sieger.de – Diomed Stakes (ex St. James Stakes).
 ifhaonline.org – International Federation of Horseracing Authorities – Diomed Stakes (2019).
 pedigreequery.com – Diomed Stakes – Epsom.
 

Flat races in Great Britain
Epsom Downs Racecourse
Open mile category horse races
Recurring sporting events established in 1971
1971 establishments in England